The government of Isfahan consists of a mayor and a 13 member municipal legislature. The Isfahan National Holy Association was involved in the Persian Constitutional Revolution. The politic of Isfahan is based on the 1979 Constitution, which made the country a theocratic Islamic republic in which the various powers are overseen by a body of clerics.

Legislature

The Islamic City Council of Isfahan is a 13 member municipal legislature.

The five representatives who were elected in the 2020 Iranian legislative election Islamic Consultative Assembly were Zahra Sheikhi, Abbas Moghtadaei, Ayatollah Hossein Mirazei, Mahdi Toghyani, and Amir Hosein Banki Poor Fard. Those elected in the 2016 Iranian Assembly of Experts election were Yousef Tabatabai Nejad, Abdul-Nabi Namazi, Abdolmahmoud Abdollahi, Morteza Moghtadai and Abdolhasan Mahdavi.

Between 2019 and 2020, the Municipality of Isfahan had a budget of approximately sixtrillion tomans, an 86% increase compared to 2018. 71% of the budget is allocated for construction. The budget is expected to double in 2021.

Executive

Districts
List of neighborhoods in Isfahan

 District 1: Bid Abad, Darb Koosh, Lenban, Shahzade Ebrahim, Abas Abad, Posht Baro
 District 2: Barzan
 District 3: Ahmad Aabad, Sartaveh, Juybareh, Shahshahan, Baghkaran	
 District 4: Moshtagh, Penart, Shahrak-e Zayandeh Rud
 District 5: Sichan, Bagh Zereshk
 District 6: Denart, Bagh Negar - Ayne Khane, Mardavij 
 District 7: Baboldasht, Sheikh Eshragh, Barazande, Bagh Fadak, Kave, Milad, Farvardin, Shahed, Molavi, Poria Vali, Rahim abad
 District 8: Khane Efahan
 District 9: Jerokan, Javan, Zajan, Nazhvan, Nasr Abad, Baharanchi, Zahran, Koohanestan, Valdan, Ladaan, Goortan, Golestan, Azadan, Kardalan
 District 10: Atsharan, Parvin, Askarieh, Mosala, Haftoon, Laleh, Sheikh Tosi, Sarvestan, Dashtestan, Fajr, Khajeh Amid, Kooye Narges, Joharan, South hase, Mola Sadra, Atar neishabori, Gorgan
 District 11: Limjir, Eslami, Darb Meidan (Sajad), Mashadeh,  Babukan, Zajan, Tahoneh, Rehnan 
 District 12: Asheghabad
 District 13: Ferdows Garden, Vali Asr, Amirie, Ziar, Keshavarzi, Ghaemie, Dastgerd khiar, Golzar, Shafagh
 District 14: Dark, Imam Khomeini, Montazer al-Mahdi, Aman Samani, Mahdie, Elahie, Arznan, Sodan, Doteflan, Shahpasand, North Hase
 District 15: Sofla, Rajaei, Buzan, Pozve, Arghavanie, Gavart, Raran, Khatoon abad, Bertianchi (Ghale no), Andvan, Deh no Kalman,Jey Shir, Jey Rural District, Kangaz, Ardaji, Sofla, Kerdabad, Satar

See also

Isfahan Police Department
Administration of Isfahan

Further reading 
 City Councillors and the Dilemma of Representation: The Case of Isfahan

References

External links
 Mayor official twitter
Office of supreme leader

Isfahan